Eric Freeman is a computer scientist, author and constituent of David Gelernter on the Lifestreaming concept.

Authored works
Eric Freeman has publishing accolades for Head First HTML and CSS which he co-authored with Elisabeth Robson, and Head First Design Patterns also co-authored with Elisabeth Robson, Kathy Sierra and Bert Bates.

References

External links

http://www.technologyreview.com/tr35/Profile.aspx?TRID=479
http://portal.acm.org/citation.cfm?id=1057270.1057279
http://www.objectsbydesign.com/books/EricFreeman.html

American technology writers
American computer scientists
Living people
Year of birth missing (living people)